Real Sociedad Deportiva Alcalá B is a Spanish football team based in Alcalá de Henares in the Community of Madrid. Founded in 1929, it is the reserve team of RSD Alcalá and it plays in Primera Regional Madrid – Group 2, holding home matches at Estadio Alcala (El Val-H.A.), with a capacity of 800.

Season to season

References

External links
Official website 
Futbolme team profile 

RSD Alcalá
Football clubs in the Community of Madrid